Vreeland is a surname. Notable people with the surname include:

Caroline Vreeland, German-American singer, actress, and model
Charles E. Vreeland (1852–1916), U.S. Navy admiral
Delmart Vreeland (born 1966), American person associated with the September 11 attacks
Diana Vreeland (1903–1989), American magazine editor (editor of Vogue)
Edward B. Vreeland (1856–1936), United States Representative from New York
James Vreeland (born 1971), American professor of political science
James P. Vreeland, New Jersey politician
Richard Vreeland (born 1986), American composer and musician, better known by his stage name Disasterpeace
Susan Vreeland (1946–2017), American author